The Paxmal is a peace monument built by Karl Bickel between 1924 and 1949, in Walenstadtberg above Walenstadt, in front of the Churfirsten mountain range Switzerland.

The left wall depicts the earthly life: a human couple in its existence and development, love and procreation. The right wall is devoted to the spiritual life: the beings who are awakened, struggling, and which keep growing.  

Karl Bickel was a Swiss artist who worked for the Swiss Post as a  stamps graphic designer.

References

External links

 Karl Bickel Museum in Walenstadt

Monuments and memorials in Switzerland
Buildings and structures in the canton of St. Gallen
Walenstadt
Tourist attractions in the canton of St. Gallen